Bicol, known formally as the Bicol Region or colloquially as Bicolandia (Rinconada Bikol: Rehiyon ka Bikol; Waray Sorsogon, Masbateño: Rehiyon san Bikol), is an administrative region of the Philippines, designated as Region V. Bicol comprises six provinces, four on the Bicol Peninsula mainland (the southeastern end of Luzon) – Albay, Camarines Norte, Camarines Sur, and Sorsogon – and the offshore island provinces of Catanduanes and Masbate.

The regional center is Legazpi City and has one Independent Component City, the pilgrim city of Naga. The region is bounded by the Lamon Bay to the north, the Philippine Sea to the east, and the Sibuyan Sea and Ragay Gulf to the west. The northernmost provinces, Camarines Norte and Camarines Sur, are bordered to the west by the province of Quezon.

Geography
The Bicol Region comprises the southern part of Luzon, the largest island in the Philippine archipelago. The total land area is 5.9% of the total land area of the country. Around 69.3% of the total land area is alienable and disposable while the remaining 30.7% is public forest areas.

History
The Bicol region was known as Ibalong, variously interpreted to derive form ibalio, "to bring to the other side"; ibalon, "people from the other side" or "people who are hospitable and give visitors gifts to bring home"; or as a corruption of Gibal-ong, a sitio of Magallanes, Sorsogon where the Spaniards first landed in 1567. The Bicol River was first mentioned in Spanish documents in 1572. The region was also called Los Camarines after the huts found by the Spaniards in Camalig, Albay. No prehistoric animal fossils have been discovered in Bicol and the peopling of the region remains obscure. The Aeta from Camarines Sur to Sorsogon strongly suggest that aborigines lived there long ago, but earliest evidence is of middle to late Neolithic life.

A barangay (village) system was in existence by 1569. Records show no sign of Islamic rule nor any authority surpassing the datu (chieftain). Precolonial leadership was based on strength, courage, and intelligence. The native seemed apolitical. Thus, the datu's influence mattered most during crises like wars. Otherwise, early Bicol society remained family centered, and the leader was the head of the family.

The Spanish influence in Bicol resulted mainly from the efforts of Augustinian and Franciscan Spanish missionaries. The first churches in Bicol, the San Francisco Church, and the Naga Cathedral, both in Naga City, along with the Holy Cross Parish in Nabua, Camarines Sur, are instituted by the Holy Order of the Franciscans. One of the oldest dioceses in the Philippines, the Archdiocese of Caceres, was also instituted in the Bicol Region. During this time, Bicol was dotted by many astilleros (shipyards) which were focused on constructing Manila Galleons, the heaviest ships in their time, from the local hardwood forests and these Manila Galleons were responsible for trade between Asia and the Americas. Bicol also has Latin-American settlements and cultural influence mostly from Mexico due to the abundance of chili pepper plantations in the area, as it is Mexican in origin. Bicolano cuisine is noted for the propensity of being spicy. However regardless, the region throughout its history has been among the hardest to control by Spanish, American, and Japanese occupants due to heavy resistance among the populace.

Administrative divisions

Provinces 

The region comprises six provinces: Albay, Camarines Norte, Camarines Sur, Sorsogon and the island-provinces of Catanduanes and Masbate, 107 Municipalities and 3,471 Barangays

As of 2020, Camarines Sur is the region's largest province in area and population, occupying  or around 30.4% of the total land area with a population of 2,068,244. Catanduanes is the smallest in area as well as population with only  or 8.4% of the total regional area and a population of 271,879.

Governors and vice governors

Cities 

The region has one independent component city, Naga, and six component cities – Iriga, Legazpi, Ligao, Masbate City, Sorsogon City, and Tabaco. Masbate and Sorsogon are cities in their eponymous provinces.

Demographics

Bicol Region has a population of 6,082,165 as of 2020 census, growing at an average annual rate of 1.29 percent between 2010 and 2015. The region's population density increased to 320 persons per square kilometer in 2015.

In 1970, Camarines Sur was the only province with close to a million population. Albay, which was next in rank, reached the 1970 population level of Camarines Sur only 20 years later.  Masbate and Sorsogon were in the same level every census year from 1970 to 1980. It is noteworthy that distribution and growth of the 1970 population were towards areas that were sparsely populated but agriculturally rich and/or endowed with fishery resources. The island province of Catanduanes and its municipalities have exhibited very low population growth from 1970 to 1980.

In 1980, the pattern was towards urbanization. This was due to the pull of newly installed infrastructures, particularly roads, and the sporadic growth of trade in strategically situated municipalities that have better economic opportunities. The 1990 growth originated from the strong attraction of employment opportunities in established urban centers, which have become a source of growth of adjacent municipalities.  This situation was highly evident in Naga and Legazpi areas, whose surrounding municipalities exhibited high growth rates.  Unmistakably, the spill-over effects of development permeated those initial high growth areas.

Population spill-over happened in the Legazpi, Naga and Daet areas. Due to more population and more opportunities, Naga, Daet and Legazpi spilled their population to their neighboring and adjacent towns.

The Bicolanos are descended from the Austronesian-speaking immigrants who came from Southern China during the Iron Age. Many of Bicolanos also have Chinese, Arab, and Spanish admixtures. Most of the townsfolk have Spanish Mixtures and their language is referred to as Bikol or Bikolano. Bicolanos have a high percentage of Spanish introgression with a government sponsored study showing 2 out of 10 Bicolanos or 2/10ths of the population being of Spanish descent. Only the Chavacanos among the Philippine ethnic groups, have a higher Spanish percentage at 4/10ths of the population, compared to Bicolano's 2/10ths, while the average percentage of Spanish descent among other Filipino Lowland Christian Ethnic groups are 6% out of 100%. The Bicolano language is very fragmented, and its dialects are mutually incomprehensible to speakers of other Bicolano dialects. The majority of the Bicolano people are devout Roman Catholics due to the Spanish conquering the country and converting them to their religion. Catholic Mass is celebrated daily in many churches in the Bicol Region.

Language

The people of the Bicol Region, called Bicolanos, speak any of the several languages of the Bikol language family, called Bikol macrolanguages, an Austronesian languages closely grouped under the Central Philippine languages family such as the Visayan languages and Tagalog. The four major groups of language in Bikol are Coastal Bikol (with four sub-languages), Inland Bikol (with six sub-languages), Pandan Bikol (lone language) and Bisakol (with three sub-languages). The majority of Bicolanos understand and speak Central Bikol language (a member of Coastal Bikol group of languages) since it is the language used in literature and mass media, but with varying degrees. A known misconception of many Bicolanos is that Central Bikol, used in the cities of Legazpi and Naga, is the standard Bikol. Central Bikol, though spoken by the majority and with speakers represented in all provinces in the region, is not a standard Bikol since other forms of Bikol used in the region are separate languages and usually unintelligible. However, the standard form of Central Bikol language is the Canaman dialect.

Other Bikol languages are Rinconada Bikol, spoken in southern part of Camarines Sur province, Pandan Bikol spoken in northern part of Catanduanes island and the Albay Bikol group of languages that include Buhinon, Libon, West Miraya and East Miraya. Albay Bikol speakers can be found in Buhi, Camarines Sur, central and eastern parts of Albay and in Donsol, Sorsogon. The standard form of Rinconada Bikol both in pronunciation and writing is the Sinabukid (Highland) dialect of Iriga variant. On the other hand, Buhinon of Buhi, Camarines Sur and Libon of Libon, Albay are the languages that are only used in their respective municipalities. Rinconada Bikol and Albay Bikol group of languages are members of Inland Bikol, while Pandan Bikol is the only language with no sub-languages or division.

The majority of the population in Masbate and Sorsogon speaks Masbateño, Waray Sorsoganon and Northern Sorsoganon. The three are Visayan languages but influenced by Bikol languages (especially the latter), thus tagged and collectively referred to as Bisakol (Being Visayan languages spoken in Bicol), a portmanteau of Bisaya (Visayan) and Bikol (Bicolano).

Aside from Masbateño, three more Visayan languages are spoken in Masbate, including Hiligaynon/Ilonggo are spoken in the southwestern tip, while Cebuano and Waray-Waray are spoken in the southern part of the island province respectively. Tagalog is the dominant and native language of Bicolanos living in the municipalities in the northern half of Camarines Norte and the town of Del Gallego in Camarines Sur.

Bicolanos also speak and understand Filipino, the national language of the Philippines, aside from native Tagalog-speaking Bicolanos in northern half of Camarines Norte and Del Gallego. English is widely understood in businesses, schools and public places.

Religion

The region retains Roman Catholicism as the overwhelming religion of the great majority. The Catholic religion has the highest number of followers than any other area in the Philippines. The Catholic church grew in the Bicol Region through the efforts of the bishops from Nueva Caceres (Naga City) from the 17th century until the Philippine Revolution in 1898. Naga City is the religious center of the Bicol Region and is the seat of one of the oldest dioceses in the Philippines, the ecclesiastical Archdiocese of Caceres. Other dioceses include are the Dioceses of Legazpi, Sorsogon, Daet, Masbate, Libmanan and Virac. Fiestas (Feast day of saints) are annual celebrations of parishes, from a simple barrio fiesta honoring a patron associated for good harvest, to a town fiesta honoring a miraculous saint, a diocesan fiesta like the feast of Our Lady of Salvation, or a regional one such as the Our Lady of Peñafrancia Fiesta, the largest Marian devotion in Asia, a week-long celebration to honor the Virgin Mary, dubbed as the "Patroness of Bicolandia". In Luzon, the Bicol Region holds the most men entering the seminary for Catholic priesthood, or women entering the religious life to become Catholic nuns. This can be accredited to the Holy Rosary Minor Seminary, Daughters of Mary, and Daughters of Charity Convents in Naga City.

The largest minority religion in the region is Iglesia ni Cristo (INC) known for its magnificent worship buildings, commonly called chapels or kapilya, with towering spires that dot the Bicol landscape. Each province represents one ecclesiastical district (E.D.) with the exception of Camarines Sur which is divided into two – Camarines Southwest E.D. in Naga, and Camarines Southeast E.D. in Iriga City. In total, INC has seven ecclesiastical districts in the Bicol region. The chapel of local congregation of Legazpi, Albay is the biggest.

Other religions are also well represented in Bicol such as Jehovah's Witnesses, Protestants denominations of Seventh-Day Adventist church, Baptist Church, Pentecostal, Islam, and indigenous religions.

Prior to colonization, the region had a complex religious system which involved various deities. Among these deities include: Gugurang, the supreme god who dwells inside of Mount Mayon where he guards and protects the sacred fire in which Aswang, his brother was trying to steal. Whenever people disobey his orders, wishes and commit numerous sins, he would cause Mount Mayon to burst lava as a sign of warning for people to mend their crooked ways. Ancient Bikolanos had a rite performed for him called Atang; Asuang, the evil god who always try to steal the sacred fire of Mount Mayon from his brother, Gugurang. Addressed sometimes as Aswang, he dwells mainly inside Mount Malinao. As an evil god, he would cause the people to suffer misfortunes and commit sins. Enemy of Gugurang and a friend of Bulan the god of the moon; Haliya, the masked goddess of the moonlight and the archenemy of Bakunawa and protector of Bulan. Her cult is composed primarily of women. There is also a ritual dance named after her as it is performed to be a countermeasure against Bakunawa.; Bulan, the god of the pale moon, he is depicted as a pubescent boy with uncommon comeliness that made savage beast and the vicious mermaids (Magindara) tame. He has deep affection towards Magindang, but plays with him by running away so that Magindang would never catch him. The reason for this is because he is shy to the man that he loves. If Magindang manages to catch Bulan, Haliya always comes to free him from Magindang's grip; Magindang, the god of the sea and all its creatures. He has deep affection to the lunar god Bulan and pursues him despite never catching him. Due to this, the Bicolanos reasoned that it is to why the waves rise to reach the moon when seen from the distant horizon. Whenever he does catch up to Bulan, Haliya comes to rescue Bulan and free him immediately; Okot, god of forest and hunting; and Bakunawa, a gigantic sea serpent deity who is often considered as the cause of eclipses, the devourer of the sun and the moon, and an adversary of Haliya as Bakunawa's main aim is to swallow Bulan, who Haliya swore to protect for all of eternity.

Culture and traits

The Bicolano cuisine is primarily noted for the prominent use of chili peppers and gata (coconut milk) in its food. A classic example is the gulay na lada, known outside the region as Bicol Express, a well-loved dish using siling labuyo (native small chillies) and the aforementioned gata.

Like their other neighboring regions, Bicolanas are also expected to lend a hand in household work. They are even anticipated to offer assistance after being married. On the other hand, Bicolano men are expected to assume the role of becoming the primary source of income and financial support of his family.

Bicolanos are also known for being very religious, the place is known for Señora De Peñafrancia. Bicolanos are often sweet, regionalistic, friendly, adventurous, puts high importance on education and social status. Contrary to what is believed, not all Bicolanos are fond of chili. Men often know how to cook.

Infrastructure

Roads and Bridges
 Matnog – Santa Magdalena – Bulusan Road – This project was a road improvement of Matnog – Santa Magdalena – Bulusan Road, linking the coastal barangays of Santa Magdalena – Bulusan – Matnog in the Province of Sorsogon. This road also serves as an alternate route due to the traffic impairment along Daang Maharlika and also an access road leading to different tourist destination. The project was started on August 6, 2015, and was completed on July 20, 2018.

Economy

Bicol Region has a large amount of rich flatland, and agriculture is the largest component of the economy, followed by commercial fishing. Coconuts, abaca, banana, coffee and jackfruit are the top five permanent crops in the region. Rice and corn are among the chief seasonal crops. Coal mining is also one of the contributors to the region's economy. Commercial fishing is also important with thirteen major fishing grounds supplying fish markets in places as far as Metro Manila.

Tourism 

The region's tourism industry has been revived by the popularity of Mayon Volcano, the new CamSur Water Sports Complex, whale shark spotting, among others, which consequently increased the number of upscale resorts. Naga City has its colonial churches, and pilgrimages to Our Lady of Peñafrancia.

The municipality of Daet and Catanduanes province have long been destinations for surfers. The opening of the Bicol International Airport in Legazpi City was hoped to further boost tourism in the region.

Geology
Bicol region is highly volcanic in origin and part of the Pacific Ring of Fire. Known as the Bicol Volcanic Arc or Chain, the volcanoes are the results of the Philippine Sea Plate subducting under the Philippine Mobile Belt, along the Philippine Trench.  Volcanism is evident by the number of hot springs, crater lakes, and volcanoes that dot the region starting from Mount Labo in Camarines Norte to the Gate Mountains in Matnog, Sorsogon.

Mayon Volcano is the most prominent of the volcanoes in the region, famous for its perfect conical shape and for being the most active in the Philippines. Its eruptions have repeatedly inflicted disasters on the region, but during lulls in activity, it is a particularly magnificent peak.  The southernmost tip of the peninsula is dominated by Bulusan Volcano, the other active volcano in the region. Tiwi in Albay and the Bacon-Manito area between Sorsogon and Albay are the sites of two major geothermal fields that contribute substantially to the Bicol Power Grid, which is the only independent power grid in the Philippines.

Volcanoes
From North to South

Education

From 1945 until 2011, the basic education system was composed of six years of elementary education starting at the age of 6, and four years of high school education starting at the age of 12. Further education was provided by technical or vocational schools, or in higher education institutions such as universities. Although the 1987 Constitution stated that elementary education was compulsory, this was never enforced.
 
In 2011, the country started to transition from its old 10-year basic educational system to a K–12 educational system, as mandated by the Department of Education. The new 12-year system is now compulsory, along with the adoption of new curriculum for all schools (see 2010s and the K–12 program). The transition period will end with the 2017–2018 school year, which is the graduation date for the first group of students who entered the new educational system.

All public schools in the Philippines must start classes on the date mandated by the Department of Education (usually the first Monday for public, second Monday for private and third Monday for some colleges for the month of June) since the presidency of Joseph Estrada in 1999, and must end after each school completes the mandated 200-day school calendar organized by the Department of Education (usually around the third week of March to the second week of April). Private schools are not obliged to abide by a specific date but must open classes no later than the last week of August.

Notable people

References

External links 
 
 
 
 

 
Regions of the Philippines
Luzon
Peninsulas of the Philippines